Geoffrey Austin Street,  (21 January 1894 – 13 August 1940) was an Australian army officer and politician. He was a member of the United Australia Party (UAP) and served as Minister for Defence (1938–1939), the Army (1939–1940) and Repatriation (1940) in the early years of Australia's involvement in the Second World War.

Street enlisted in the Australian Imperial Force (AIF) on the outbreak of the First World War. He served in the Gallipoli Campaign and on the Western Front, winning the Military Cross and ending the war with the rank of major; he was later promoted to brigadier in the reserve of officers. Street subsequently farmed near Lismore, Victoria, entering politics with the support of Robert Menzies. He won the Division of Corangamite at the 1934 federal election and was promoted to cabinet in 1938 by Prime Minister Joseph Lyons. Following Lyons' death the following year, Menzies became prime minister and Street oversaw an expansion of the military. He was killed in the 1940 Canberra air disaster along with two cabinet colleagues and the head of the army.

Early life and education
Street was born on 21 January 1894 in Woollahra, New South Wales. A member of the Street family, he was the second of four children born to Mary Veronica (née Austin) and John William Street. His father was a "prosperous city solicitor" and his mother was the niece of poet laureate Alfred Austin. His maternal grandfather Henry Austin was the chairman of the Perpetual Trustee Company, which was founded by his forebear John Rendell Street. He attended Sydney Grammar School, where he was captain of the school cricket team and also represented the school in rugby union, swimming and athletics. He passed his senior examinations in December 1912 and enrolled in law at the University of Sydney, initially studying towards a Bachelor of Arts degree. He had an "undistinguished academic record" but continued his involvement in sport, both as a player and in administrative capacities.

First World War

In August 1914, following the outbreak of the First World War, Street enlisted as a private in the Australian Naval and Military Expeditionary Force. He was due to sail with the expeditionary force to German New Guinea, but instead transferred to the 1st Brigade of the Australian Imperial Force (AIF) in order to go to Europe. He was commissioned as a second lieutenant in the 1st Battalion and left Sydney aboard HMAT Afric on 18 October 1914.

Street arrived in Alexandria, Egypt, in early December. After further training his battalion sailed via Lemnos to participate in the Gallipoli campaign. He participated in the Landing at Anzac Cove on 25 April 1915 as platoon commander of "D" Company. He and his men reinforced a hill named Baby 700 and succeeded in holding the position for several days. Street received a "slight" wound to the head and was evacuated back to Egypt, where he was promoted to full lieutenant with effect from 26 April. He returned a month later and led a mission on 4 June to eliminate an Ottoman machine-gun, which ended in him "unexpectedly stumbling into Turkish troops in a supposedly unoccupied 'sniper’s trench'". His sergeant on the mission Harry Freame became a lifelong friend. Street was subsequently appointed acting adjutant of the 1st Battalion and in November was promoted to captain. He and the 1st Battalion were evacuated to Egypt the following month.

In early 1916, Street went to France with the 1st Battalion. He was soon seconded to the 14th Battalion where served as staff captain during the Battle of Fromelles, in charge of the 4th Brigade's report centre. He was sent to Cambridge, England, for further training in February 1917. He returned to the front in July 1917 as brigade major to Brigadier General Harold "Pompey" Elliott; he was promoted major in October. Their working relationship was poor. While Elliott described Street as "a very decent boy" and "a very lovable lad", he regarded him as constantly needing direction and overinvolved with recreational activities. He also "resented having the charming and well-connected staff officer foisted upon him" in place of one of his own men of a lower social standing. Street was finally transferred away from Elliott's staff in April 1918 following an incident in which a poorly worded order placed three battalions in danger.

In early 1918 Street learned that he had been awarded the Military Cross in the 1918 New Year Honours. After his marriage in June he rejoined the 1st Battalion at Pradelles and was appointed officer commanding of "A" Company. His unit saw action in the Second Battle of the Somme as well as skirmishes at Chuignolles and Hargicourt. Street was shot in the wrist by a machine gun bullet in September 1918, and after a period of sick leave joined the Demobilisation and Repatriation Branch in London. His AIF appointment was terminated on 2 August 1919. Three of his cousins were killed in the war, and his younger brother Anthony died in the 1918 Spanish flu pandemic while on active duty.

Post-war activities

Street and his wife returned to Australia in 1920 and settled on a property near Lismore in the Western District of Victoria, which had been part of his father-in-law's estate. There he raised and exhibited Polwarth sheep, becoming involved with the Australian Sheep Breeders' Association and the Lismore Agricultural and Pastoral Society. Street was elected to the Hampden Shire Council in 1924 and served as shire president from 1931 to 1932. He was a member of the reserve of officers and in December 1932 was promoted to lieutenant colonel as regimental commander of the 4th Light Horse Regiment. He would later be given command of the 3rd Cavalry Brigade in 1935 and promoted to temporary brigadier. 

Street was an early member of the Young Nationalists Organisation founded by Robert Menzies. He served as campaign secretary for Thomas Chester Manifold at the 1929 Victorian state election. In 1933, his public profile was raised when Menzies, the Victorian railways minister, appointed him to the Victorian Transport Regulation Board. He was the principal author of its report into transport regulation.

Federal politics

At the request of Robert Menzies, Street stood for and won Corangamite in 1934. He became Minister of Defence in November 1938 and played a major role in the expansion of the military and munitions production prior to the outbreak of the Second World War and pushed the National Registration Act (1939) through parliament despite strong opposition. Following the outbreak of war he worked to put Australia on a war footing. From November 1939, Menzies abolished the position of Minister for Defence and appointed Street Minister for the Army and Minister for Repatriation.

Street died in the Canberra air disaster, 1940, along with two other Cabinet ministers. His son, Tony Street, was Member for Corangamite from 1966 to 1984, and a senior minister in Malcolm Fraser's government.

Personal life
Street married Evora Frances "Gyp" Currie on 29 June 1918 at St Columba's Church, London. He first met his future wife when he played cricket against her brother in 1912. She had arrived in England in 1916 as a volunteer and served with a Voluntary Aid Detachment.

Street had a lifelong love of cricket and had a collection of nearly 600 books on the sport. During the war he and Test cricketer Charlie Kelleway organised games on makeshift pitches. His post-war career was hampered by his wounded wrist but he played six years of first-grade cricket for the Melbourne Cricket Club, bowling leg spin. Other Test cricketers he played alongside included Warwick Armstrong, Bill Ponsford, Bill Woodfull and Jack Ryder, sometimes in charity matches.

References

Further reading

1894 births
1940 deaths
United Australia Party members of the Parliament of Australia
Members of the Cabinet of Australia
Members of the Australian House of Representatives for Corangamite
Members of the Australian House of Representatives
Recipients of the Military Cross
Victims of aviation accidents or incidents in Australia
Accidental deaths in the Australian Capital Territory
Defence ministers of Australia
20th-century Australian politicians
Geoffrey
Victims of aviation accidents or incidents in 1940
Australian military personnel of World War I